In enzymology, a glutamate—tRNA ligase is an enzyme that catalyzes the chemical reaction

ATP + L-glutamate + tRNAGlu  AMP + diphosphate + L-glutamyl-tRNAGlu

The 3 substrates of this enzyme are ATP, L-glutamate, and tRNA(Glu), whereas its 3 products are AMP, diphosphate, and L-glutamyl-tRNA(Glu).

This enzyme belongs to the family of ligases, to be specific those forming carbon-oxygen bonds in aminoacyl-tRNA and related compounds.  The systematic name of this enzyme class is L-glutamate:tRNAGlu ligase (AMP-forming). Other names in common use include glutamyl-tRNA synthetase, glutamyl-transfer ribonucleate synthetase, glutamyl-transfer RNA synthetase, glutamyl-transfer ribonucleic acid synthetase, glutamate-tRNA synthetase, and glutamic acid translase.  This enzyme participates in 3 metabolic pathways: glutamate metabolism, porphyrin and chlorophyll metabolism, and aminoacyl-trna biosynthesis.

Structural studies

References

 

EC 6.1.1
Enzymes of known structure